The following is a list of presidents pro tempore of the North Dakota Senate, a position that was created with the state's constitution in 1889. The term indicated is the year of the legislative session in which the individual served as president pro tempore.

Notes

External links
State of North Dakota official website

Presidents pro tempore of the North Dakota Senate
Lists of North Dakota politicians